Heuweloord is a suburb in Centurion, South Africa. The suburb is intersected by the R55 route.

References

External links 
Heuweloord Community Website.

Suburbs of Centurion, Gauteng